Irena Belohorská (born 13 March 1948 in Piešťany) is a Slovak politician and Member of the European Parliament with the Ludova strana - Hnutie za demokraticke Slovensko from 2004 to 2009.

She sits on its Committee on the Environment, Public Health and Food Safety, and is a substitute for the Committee on Foreign Affairs and a member of the Delegation for relations with the countries of Central America.

Education 
 1976: Certificate of postgraduate study, grade one, in gynaecology and obstetrics
 1982: Certificate of postgraduate study in clinical oncology
 1992: European School of Oncology

Career 
 1973-1976: Doctor's assistant
 1977-1983: National Oncological Institute
 1983-1986: Expert doctor, Tunis
 1986-2002: Head doctor of the Preventive Centre at the National Oncological Institute
 1992-1993: Head of a faculty hospital
 1993: Head of the Office of the Ministry of Defence
 1993: State Secretary at the Ministry of Foreign Affairs
 1993-1994: Minister of Health
 1993: Member of HZDS (Movement for a Democratic Slovakia)
 1996: Chairwoman of a town organisation of HZDS
 1999: Member of the European Democrat Group at the Council of Europe
 1992: Member of the Federal Assembly of the Czechoslovak Federative Republic
 1994-2004: Member of the National Council of the Slovak Republic
 1994-1998: Vice-Chairwoman of the Foreign Affairs Committee
 1994-1998: Vice-Chairwoman of the Committee for European Integration
 2002-2004: Vice-Chairwoman of the Human Rights Committee
 1994-2004: Member of the Permanent Delegation of the National Council of the Slovak Republic to the Council of Europe
 1994-2002: Member of the Delegation to the Western European Union
 1994-2002: Member of the Delegation to the NATO Parliamentary Assembly
 1997-1999: Chairwoman of the Subcommittee on Health of the Council of Europe
 2003: Chairwoman of the Social, Health and Family Affairs Committee of the Council of Europe

Decorations
 1994: Awarded the decoration 'Rad A Hlinku I stupňa' (Order of Andrej Hlinka, First Class) in

See also
 2004 European Parliament election in Slovakia

External links 
 
 

1948 births
Living people
People from Piešťany
People's Party – Movement for a Democratic Slovakia MEPs
MEPs for Slovakia 2004–2009
MEPs for Slovakia 2009–2014
Women MEPs for Slovakia
Health ministers of Slovakia
Women government ministers of Slovakia
Members of the National Council (Slovakia) 1994-1998
Members of the National Council (Slovakia) 1998-2002
Members of the National Council (Slovakia) 2002-2006
Female members of the National Council (Slovakia)